In Cascading Style Sheets, CSS grid layout or CSS grid creates complex responsive web design grid layouts more easily and consistently across browsers.  Historically, there have been other methods for controlling web page layout methods, such as tables, floats, and more recently, CSS Flexible Box Layout (flexbox). CSS grid is currently not an official standard (it is a W3C Candidate Recommendation) although it has been adopted by the recent versions of all current major browsers.

Motivation 
CSS grid can create more robust and flexible layouts than the previous options like CSS floats. It also allows for more standardized code that works across browsers. This is in contrast to relying on specific browser hacks or complicated workarounds.

One issue with exploiting floats in CSS is that if content gets added to one portion of the page it could disrupt the flow of the page and break the layout. This is due to the varying heights for layout elements. Though flexbox supports flexible layouts and provides the flexibility of creating complex layouts, it fails when the need for creating responsive layouts in 2-dimensional space arises.

History 
The first comprehensive draft of a grid layout for CSS was created by Phil Cupp at Microsoft in 2011 and implemented in Internet Explorer 10 behind a -ms- vendor prefix. The syntax was restructured and further refined through several interations in the CSS Working Group, led primarily by Elika Etemad and Tab Atkins Jr. The feature was widely adopted by web developers after evangelism led primarily by Rachel Andrew and Jen Simmons.

Browser support 
As of October 2017, Chrome, Firefox, Safari and Edge all support CSS grid without vendor prefixes. IE 10 and 11 support CSS grid but with an outdated specification. On mobile, all modern browsers support CSS grid except for Opera Mini. Web developers targeting older browsers can utilize Modernizr 3.5.0 to detect and gracefully degrade the webpage as needed.

Utilization in frameworks 
Tailwind CSS incorporates CSS grid into its utilities for controlling how elements are sized and placed. However many other current web frameworks do not incorporate CSS grid, such as Bootstrap 4 and Foundation 6.

the fr unit 

The "fr" unit is often used with CSS grid layout.
The "fr" unit, part of the CSS grid layout specification, represents a fraction of the leftover space in the grid container.

Examples

"Holy grail" layout 
The following is an example of the "holy grail" layout:

Table of values 
The following is an example of a table of values:

References

External links
CSS Grid Layout Module Level 1
CSS Grid vs Flexbox

Cascading Style Sheets
World Wide Web Consortium standards
Web design